Bahramabad (also Romanized as Bahrāmābād) is a village in Bahramabad Rural District, in the Central District of Eslamshahr County, Tehran Province, Iran. At the 2006 census, its population was 1,770, in 407 families. The seat of Bahramabad Rural District is located in this village.

References 

Populated places in Eslamshahr County